The VII South American Games (Spanish: Juegos Sudamericanos; Portuguese: Jogos Sul-Americanos) were a multi-sport event held in 2002 in Rio de Janeiro, São Paulo, Curitiba, and Belém; all in Brazil. The Games were organized by the South American Sports Organization (ODESUR).  An appraisal of the games and detailed medal lists were published
elsewhere,
emphasizing the results of the Argentinian teams.

In Belém, the games were officially opened by the governor of the state of Pará, Almir Gabriel. Torch lighter was bowler Dayse Silva.

Originally awarded to Córdoba, Argentina, the Games were moved to Bogotá, Colombia, following an economic crisis in Argentina. Later, violence between the Colombian government and guerrillas caused Bolivia, Chile, Paraguay and Venezuela to threaten to leave the Games, which resulted in the relocation to Brazil. Colombia did not send a delegation to protest this decision.

Medal count

The medal count for these Games is tabulated below. This table is sorted by the number of gold medals earned by each country.  The number of silver medals is taken into consideration next, and then the number of bronze medals.

Sports

 Archery
 Athletics†
 Basketball
 Bowling
 Boxing
 Canoeing
 Cycling
 Fencing
 Futsal
 Golf
 Gymnastics
 Judo
 Handball
 Karate
 Roller sports
 Rowing
 Sailing
 Shooting
 Swimming‡
 Triathlon
 Table Tennis†
 Taekwondo
 Tennis‡
 Weightlifting
 Wrestling

Notes
†: The competition was contested by junior representatives (U-20).

‡: The competition was contested by youth representatives (U-18).

Venues

Belem

Estádio do Mangueirão - Athletics
Ginásio da Escola Superior de Educação Física - Aquatics, Boxing and Werstling

Curitiba
Iguaçu Park - Canoeing
Curitba-Paranagua Highway - Cycling (road)
Barigui Park - Cycling (Mountain Bike)
Botanical Garden Velodrome - Cycling (track)
Tarumã Gymnasium - Gymnastics

Rio de Janeiro
Botafogo Gymnasium - Fencing
Maracanazinho Gymnasium - Futsal
Tijuca Tennis Club - Judo, Taekwondo
Lagoa Rodrigo de Freitas - Rowing
CEFAN - Archery
AMAN, Resende - Shooting
Posto 6 - Triathlon
Iate Clube - Sailing

São Paulo
Lago Alpha Village, Itu - Aquatic Skiing
Paradise Golf Club, Mogi das Cruzes - Golf
Municipal Gymnasium, São Bernardo do Campo - Handball
Ibirapuera Gymnasium - Karate
Olympic Training and Research Centre - Weightlifting and Table Tennis.
Banco do Brasil Athletic Association - Figure Skating
Sambodromo do Anhembi -  Speed Skating
Bom Retiro Stadium - Softball
Clube Atlético Monte Líbano - Tennis
Funstation Bowling Shopping Analia Franco - Bowling

References

External links
Brasil 2002 ODESUR page
Official site (from web.archive.org, many links are dead as results etc.)

 
South American Games
South American Games
South American Games
International sports competitions in Rio de Janeiro (city)
Multi-sport events in Brazil
South American Games
August 2002 sports events in South America
Sport in Curitiba
Belém
International sports competitions in São Paulo
21st century in São Paulo
21st century in Curitiba
2000s in Rio de Janeiro